Patrick Byrne may refer to:

Sports
 Patrick Byrne (sledge hockey) (born 1965), American ice sledge hockey player
 Patrick B. Byrne (born 1956), American horse trainer
 Paddy Byrne, Irish Free State football player in the 1930s
 Pat Byrne (footballer) (born 1956), Irish football player and manager

Music
 Patrick Byrne (musician) (1794–1863), Irish traditional musician
 Pat Byrne (singer) (born 1991), winner of the first series of The Voice of Ireland

Others
 John Byrne (playwright) (born 1940), who, as a painter, uses the name Patrick Byrne
 Patrick Byrne (architect) (1783–1864), Irish architect
 Patrick Byrne (Irish politician) (1925–2021)
 Patrick James Byrne (1888–1950), American Catholic missionary and bishop in Korea and Japan
 Patrick M. Byrne (born 1962), American entrepreneur, founder and former CEO of Overstock.com
 Patrick Michael Byrne (anthropologist) (1856–1932), aka Paddy and Pado, scientist and telegraph master at Charlotte Waters
  Patrick Byrne (fl. 1795–1837), of Clone, Ireland, in the list of monumental masons

See also
 Pat Byrnes, cartoonist
 Patrick Burns (disambiguation)